1999–2000 Ukrainian First League was the ninth season of the Ukrainian First League which was won by FC Dynamo-2 Kyiv. The season started on July 25, 1999, and finished on June 19, 2000.

Promotion and relegation

Promoted teams
Two clubs promoted from the 1998-99 Ukrainian Second League.
Group A
 FC Zakarpattia Uzhhorod – champion (returning after a season)
Group B
 SC Odesa – champion (returning after two seasons)
Group C
 FC Obolon-PPO Kyiv – champion (debut)

Relegated teams 
One club was relegated from the 1998-99 Ukrainian Top League:
 SC Mykolaiv – 16th place (returning after a season)

Reorganized clubs
 SC Odesa was merged with Chornomorets and replaced with FC Chornomorets-2 Odessa (returning after seven seasons).

Teams
In 1999-00 season, the Ukrainian First League consists of the following teams:

Standings

Top scorers 
Statistics are taken from here.

See also
1999–2000 Ukrainian Second League
1999–2000 Ukrainian Premier League

Notes

References

 The main source

External links 
 Professional Football League of Ukraine - website of the professional football league of Ukraine 

Ukrainian First League seasons
2
Ukra